A list of Spanish-produced and co-produced feature films released in 2015 in Spain. When applicable, the domestic theatrical release date is favoured.

Films

Box office 
The five highest-grossing Spanish feature films in 2015, by domestic box office gross revenue, are as follows:

See also 
 30th Goya Awards

References
Informational notes

Citations

External links
 Spanish films of 2015 at the Internet Movie Database

2015
Spanish